John Birt, Baron Birt (born 10 December 1944) is a British television executive and businessman. He is a former Director-General (1992–2000) of the BBC.

After a successful career in commercial television, initially at Granada Television and later at London Weekend Television, Birt was appointed Deputy Director-General of the BBC in 1987 for his expertise in current affairs. The forced departure of Director-General Alasdair Milne after pressure from the Thatcher government required someone near the top, preferably from outside the BBC, with editorial and production experience (Milne had been summarily replaced by Michael Checkland, an accountant).

During his tenure as Director-General, Birt restructured the BBC, in the face of much internal opposition. However, others have credited him with saving the corporation from possible government privatisation, and say he prepared for the era of digital broadcasting. After leaving the BBC, Birt was Strategic Advisor to Prime Minister Tony Blair from 2001 to 2005. 
He was appointed Chairman of CPA Global in 2015.

Early life and commercial television career
Birt was born in Liverpool to a Catholic father, a manager at the Firestone tyre company, and a Protestant mother. He was raised as a Catholic, and educated at the direct-grant grammar school St. Mary's College, Crosby, near Liverpool and read engineering at St Catherine's College, Oxford, graduating from Oxford University with a third-class degree in engineering.

From 1966 to 1971, Birt worked for Granada Television, where he devised and produced the magazine programme Nice Time before joining Granada's World in Action current affairs series. Birt persuaded Mick Jagger, who had just spent three nights in Brixton prison for possession of drugs, to participate in a 1967 edition of World in Action in which Jagger conversed with the editor of The Times (William Rees-Mogg) and the Bishop of Woolwich (John A. T. Robinson), among others. It was hailed as a "dialogue between generations." With Gus Macdonald, Birt became joint editor of World in Action in 1969.

Birt moved from Granada to London Weekend Television in 1971. At LWT he was the founding editor and executive producer of the current affairs programme Weekend World. He became head of current affairs at LWT and, later, controller of features and current affairs. With Weekend World presenter Peter Jay, Birt contributed a series of three articles to The Times on the topic of television journalism. They argued that most television news and current affairs contained a "bias against understanding": pictures had taken precedence over analysis. Instead they advocated "a mission to explain". Makers of news and documentary programmes were required to outline their finished product in writing before setting out with a camera crew. Such an argument, was not universally accepted. Years later, in 2006, Alasdair Milne, the former BBC Director-General, said he thought Birt's "bias against understanding" argument was nonsense.

In the mid-1970s, he took a break from LWT to produce David Frost's The Nixon Interviews with the disgraced former US President Richard Nixon. In the 1977 interviews, watched by 45 million people, Nixon admitted his part in the scandal which had led to his resignation.

Birt returned to LWT as director of programmes in 1982. During this period he revived the career of his old friend, the Liverpool singer Cilla Black, who in due course became the highest-paid female performer on UK television. Birt formed a close working relationship with his boss at LWT, Michael Grade, although this would later sour when both were working at the BBC.

BBC career
Birt's success at LWT prompted the BBC's governors to appoint him Deputy Director-General in 1987 under Michael Checkland. Birt also served as the BBC's director of news and current affairs at this time.

Birt's promotion to Director-General in 1992 caused controversy when it was revealed he was employed on a freelance consultancy basis. Under political and public pressure, Birt became a BBC employee. He had to sell his shares in LWT, losing out on a windfall of what would have been several million pounds when it was bought by Granada in 1994. The Sunday Times later revealed that Birt had been a member of the Labour Party at the time of his appointment, a concern to Conservatives who had already expressed concerns about alleged left-wing bias at the organisation.

As Director-General, Birt was tasked with securing the BBC's future at a time of rapid technical, cultural and economic changes in world broadcasting. In seven years, Birt restructured and modernised the corporation which he wanted to make "the best managed public sector organisation". Birt imposed a policy of radical change to deliver efficiency savings. In April 1993 he introduced Producer Choice, giving programme makers the power to buy services from outside the BBC. This theoretically reduced the cost to licence-payers of the BBC's historic resource base. Faced with high rental fees from the BBC's record library, producers found it cheaper to buy records from local record shops. In-house facilities were closed or stood idle, allegedly as a result of Birt's "creative accounting" methods.

Above all, Birt is credited with preparing the organisation for the new landscape shaped by digitalisation – preparations that were "far in advance of the BBC’s terrestrial rivals", according to the academic Georgina Born. At the 1996 Edinburgh Television Festival, Birt said that without the resources to prepare for the digital age, the BBC would be "history". Birt asserted that the changes made the BBC more agile, more competitive and allowed it to expand beyond its traditional broadcasting services, but remaining licence-fee funded. He was one of the driving forces behind the launch of continuous news output and he took much money from traditional services to fund the 24-hour news channel and advance on the internet. However, such ventures were criticised by many as being clearly detrimental to BBC core programming.

Birt has argued that without his changes, the BBC's operating charter might not have been renewed in the 1990s. Birt's advocates include the journalists John Lloyd, John Simpson and Polly Toynbee. Birt's use of impenetrable jargon became known as "Birtspeak", a phenomenon mocked in the satirical magazine Private Eye, complete with a miniature Dalek caricature of Birt. The comparison originated from playwright Dennis Potter, who labeled Birt a "croak-voiced Dalek" in his MacTaggart Lecture delivered in August 1993 at the Edinburgh International Television Festival. The BBC's post-production department made a Christmas tape casting Birt as Davros, the head of the Daleks, which was alluded to many years later on a BBC DVD commentary for Genesis of the Daleks by former director David Maloney. Journalist Mark Lawson wrote at the time that Potter's "tendency towards unfocused vitriol and noisy self-examination made his contribution easily swattable by the BBC's damage controllers". Birt himself did not agree with his critics' portrait of the BBC of the time, but did allow that drama was a source of concern. "The originality is not there as it was in the Sixties", he said.

One of Birt's predecessors, Alasdair Milne, said Birt did little good for the BBC apart from establishing its internet service and criticised him for paying consultants large fees for the corporation's restructuring. Many others opposed Birt, his methods and his reforms, including the journalists John Tusa, Mark Tully and Charles Wheeler, and news correspondent Kate Adie. Radio broadcaster John Dunn believed morale was bad under Birt, while David Attenborough commented that producers spend too much time worrying about money as a result of Birt's reforms.

Birt's arrival at the BBC hastened the departure of executive Bill Cotton, who described his tenure as a "nightmare" for the BBC. Marmaduke Hussey, who appointed Birt to his BBC role, later claimed to have regrets. Some of Birt's changes were partially dismantled by his successors Greg Dyke and Mark Thompson. However, producer Tony Garnett claimed in 2009 that Birt's legacy of "totalitarian micro management" has existed at the BBC ever since.
	
In 1998, Birt imposed a ban on BBC output mentioning the private life of Peter Mandelson. This order followed an edition of Newsnight, during which Matthew Parris had said that Mandelson was homosexual. Peter Ainsworth, the Conservative shadow Culture Secretary, questioned whether this was a generic ban on mentioning private issues or specific to Mandelson.

Birt was succeeded as Director-General by Greg Dyke who also had ties to the Labour Party.

Post-BBC career

Advisor to Tony Blair
Birt was brought into Number 10 to lead the development of long-term strategy for the government on key areas of public policy. Tony Blair asked him to produce a report on solutions to crime, and he served as advisor on Criminal Justice from 2000 to 2001. The establishment of a Serious Organised Crime Agency (SOCA) was an idea originally conceived by Birt.

Birt was made unpaid Strategy Adviser to Blair in 2001, appointed for what was termed "blue skies thinking" and claimed by Deputy Prime Minister John Prescott to be "worth every penny"; Blair wanted advice from outside the traditional Whitehall mindset – he had known Birt since the 1980s and approved of his analytical approach. Jeremy Heywood, Blair's principal private secretary, said: "He liked the way that John was willing to get right down into the data and understand the evidence, and come up with a real sense that you could do things in a totally different way." Birt supervised the development of long-term strategy on drugs, health, crime reduction, education, transport and London. His 2004 report on drug policy recommended making heroin use a criminal offence on par with possession.

However, Birt's recommendations made him unpopular with some ministers and Blair's decision to ask Birt for a "private" report on crime irritated Jack Straw and the Home Office. In 2002, he proposed a second network of motorways operated as tolls to counter the problems of traffic congestion.

Many saw Birt's role in government as controversial, since as a special advisor, rather than a civil servant, he was not formally obliged to face questions from House of Commons select committees. In October 2002 it emerged that the government had specifically asked him not to appear in front of the transport select committee, at a time when he was in charge of long-term transport strategy.

Blair asked Birt to help him define his main domestic policy priorities so he could develop precise plans for the period after the 2005 election. Birt had first proposed the idea of the "five-year plans" in 2003 and was now responsible for overseeing the Third Term Plan. This included the overall policy programme, machinery of government changes and the legislative timetable. A special project team to develop the third term was led by Birt and Turnbull and reported regularly to the prime minister. Birt's team produced detailed proposals with a precise grid on how to implement policy.

Concurrently, Birt served as an advisor at McKinsey & Company's Global Media Practice from 2000 to 2005. His relationship with government and McKinsey caused some controversy as McKinsey were increasingly working with UK government departments in a range of public service and defence areas. Birt remained at Number 10 as an unpaid adviser until December 2005, when he left to join private equity firm Terra Firma Capital Partners as an adviser.

The Financial Times reported at the beginning of July 2005 that Birt's office ceiling at No 10 Downing Street had fallen in. However, Birt was not injured.

Later business career
From 2006 to 2010, he was an adviser for consulting firm Capgemini on strategic issues, with a focus on the public sector and its Telecom, Media and Entertainment practice. Birt served as chairman of Lynx New Media (subsequently Lynx Capital Ventures) from 2000 to 2004. He was chairman of Waste Recycling Group and subsequently non-executive director of Infinis, a generator of renewable power. He also served chairman of Maltby Capital from 2007 to 2010.

Birt was chairman of PayPal Europe between 2010 and 2014, having joined the board in 2004. He later served periods as chairman of Host Europe Group (2013-2017) and CPA Global (2015-2017).

He is currently Vice-Chairman of Eutelsat, having joined the board as an independent director in 2006.

Honours and awards
Birt received an Emmy in 1995, for his "outstanding contribution" to international television.

Birt was awarded a knighthood, and on 11 February 2000 he was created a life peer as Baron Birt, of Liverpool in the County of Merseyside. He took his seat in the House of Lords in March 2000 as a crossbencher.

Crossbencher in the House of Lords
Birt is an active cross-bencher in the House of Lords, speaking out in 2011 and 2012 in favour of government's proposed Health and Social Care Bill. Birt's special interests include the Media/ Broadcasting/ Communications Industry, Climate Change/ Environment, Criminal Justice and Education

In 2013 Birt voiced his opinion to the House of Lords about his views on the Gay Marriage bill stating ‘this bill goes the whole hog and rightly allows gay couples, if they wish, to make the powerful statements of love and commitment that marriage proclaims. If gay couples want that option, they should have it.’

In 2014 Birt showed his support for the assisted dying legislation, in the House of Lords debate, in which participants were evenly split. Before the 2014 Scottish referendum, Bird argued that Scottish independence would have a devastating impact on the BBC. 
 In 2015, he led criticism of the decision for the BBC to start funding TV licences for over-75s, calling it a 'deeply shocking announcement'.

Later reflections on broadcasting career
Returning to his earlier career on 26 August 2005, Birt delivered his second MacTaggart lecture at the Edinburgh International Television Festival. Partly a review of his professional life as a broadcaster, he also criticised the "tabloidisation" of intellectual concerns. More importantly, he argued that Channel 4 should receive financial help, in order to preserve "public service broadcasting", which was taken as advocacy of the BBC sharing its licence fee with Channel Four, so called "top slicing". He also mentioned that his long-standing feud with Michael Grade had been resolved, but the speech as a whole was not admired by many figures in the industry.

Following Director-General George Entwistle's resignation in November 2012, James Purnell argued that the new Director-General "should learn from the Birt era" stating that it was Birt's "boldness" that saved the BBC. Instead of playing it safe and avoiding mistakes, he said, Birt transformed output and embraced the internet, and rebuilt relationships with government, business and the public. Media commentator Steve Hewlett, Birt's former colleague and friend, suggested in 2012 that it might be time for the BBC "to bring in Birt 2.0". Hewlett acknowledged that many of Birt's reforms were unpopular, but said that without them, "it is questionable whether the BBC would exist in anything like its present capable and competitive form, or indeed would have retained the huge affection of audiences".

Bibliography

See also
 Frost/Nixon - 2007 play by Peter Morgan featuring a portrayal of John Birt
 Frost/Nixon - 2008 film adaptation of the above in which Birt was played by Matthew Macfadyen
 The Crown (season 5) - 2022 television series in which Nicholas Gleaves plays Birt

Arms

References

External links
 John Birt's MacTaggart Lecture 2005
 New Statesman interview with John Birt, 21 June 1996 by Ian Hargreaves
 Review of John Birt's The Harder Path by Peter Bazalgette in The Observer, 27 October 2002
 Announcement of his introduction at the House of Lords

1944 births
Alumni of St Catherine's College, Oxford
BBC executives
Broadcast mass media people from Liverpool
Crossbench life peers
English television executives
Knights Bachelor
Living people
McKinsey & Company people
People educated at St Mary's College, Crosby
International Emmy Directorate Award
Life peers created by Elizabeth II
Directors-General of the BBC